Il Parnaso confuso (Parnassus in Turmoil) is an opera by the composer Christoph Willibald Gluck. It takes the form of an azione teatrale in one act. The Italian-language libretto is by Pietro Metastasio. The opera premiered on 24 January 1765 at Schönbrunn Palace in Vienna. All the members of the cast were archduchesses of the Habsburg family and the work was conducted by the future Emperor Leopold II from the harpsichord.

Roles

Recording
Il Parnaso confuso The Queen's Chamber Band, conducted by Rudolph Palmer (Albany Records, 2004)

Sources
Holden, Amanda The Viking Opera Guide (Viking, 1993), page 378. 
Gluck Gesamtausgabe Il Parnaso confuso

1765 operas
Italian-language operas
Operas by Christoph Willibald Gluck
Operas
One-act operas